Sainte-Tréphine is a commune in the Côtes-d'Armor department of Brittany in northwestern France. It is named after Saint Tryphine.

Population
Inhabitants of Sainte-Tréphine are called tréphinois in French.

See also
Communes of the Côtes-d'Armor department

References

External links

Communes of Côtes-d'Armor